Ralph Campbell may refer to:

Ralph Campbell Jr. (1946–2011), state auditor of North Carolina
Ralph E. Campbell (1867–1921), United States federal judge
Woody Campbell (basketball) (1925–2004), Canadian basketball player
Ralph Campbell (Bahamas), Chief Justice of the Bahamas from 1960 to 1970